Vitali Ivanovich Balamestny (born 28 July 1980) is a former Russian professional footballer.

Career
During Gabala's 1-3 defeat to Simurq on 7 April 2007, Balamestny scored Gabala's 100th goal.

He played in the Russian Football National League for FC Krasnodar in 2009.

Career statistics

Honours
Chernomorets Novorossiysk
Russian Professional Football League South: 2010

References

1980 births
Living people
Russian footballers
Association football forwards
FC Zhemchuzhina Sochi players
FC Lokomotiv Nizhny Novgorod players
FC Dynamo Stavropol players
FC Chernomorets Novorossiysk players
FC Krasnodar players
FC Gornyak Uchaly players
Gabala FC players
Azerbaijan Premier League players
Russian expatriate footballers
Expatriate footballers in Azerbaijan
Russian expatriate sportspeople in Azerbaijan